Elections for local government were held in Northern Ireland in May 1977.

The elections saw good performances by the four largest parties: the Ulster Unionist Party (UUP), Social Democratic and Labour Party (SDLP), Alliance Party of Northern Ireland and Democratic Unionist Party (DUP), while smaller parties failed to make a breakthrough.  The DUP took control of their first council, Ballymena, while the UUP retained control of Banbridge.  The SDLP lost control of Magherafelt, their only council.

Results

Overall

By council

Antrim

Ards

Armagh

Ballymena

No election was held, as 6 candidates ran for the 6 seats.

Ballymoney

Banbridge

Belfast

Carrickfergus

Castlereagh

Coleraine

Cookstown

Craigavon

Down

Dungannon

Fermanagh

Larne

As 4 candidates ran for the 4 seats, no election was held and all candidates were declared elected.

Limavady

Lisburn

Londonderry

Magherafelt

Moyle

Newry and Mourne

Newtownabbey

North Down

Omagh

Strabane

References

 
Council elections in Northern Ireland
Local elections
Northern
1977 elections in Northern Ireland